Chandupatla Janga Reddy (18 November 1935 – 5 February 2022) was an Indian politician and member of the Bharatiya Janata Party. He was elected to the 8th Lok Sabha, the lower house of the Parliament of India from Hanamkonda, Andhra Pradesh defeating the future Prime Minister P. V. Narasimha Rao  in 1984.He helped so many poor students with their education. He was the co founder of Vaagdevi group of institutions.

Early life 
Reddy was born 18 November 1935. He worked as a teacher in Parkala Village, located in the Warangal District of Andhra Pradesh, for ten years ending in 1967.

Political career
He was a member of the Bharatiya Janata Party. He was a member of the Andhra Pradesh Legislative Assembly in 1967–72 (from Parkal as Jana Sangh member), 1978–83 (from Shyampet as Janata Party member) and 1983–84 (from Shyampet as member of BJP). He is best known for his time as Member of Parliament in the 8th Lok Sabha in 1984. That year the Bharatiya Janata Party won just two of the 543 Parliament constituencies; one was won by Chendupatla Janga Reddy, representing Hanamkonda in the then undivided Andhra Pradesh, and the other by AK Patel, representing Mehsana, Gujarat. He took active part in the Telangana Satyagraha Movement and anti-Malapumm district agitation in Kerala. He was arrested in 1970 for leading a group in Delhi in support of the recognition of Bangladesh, and imprisoned under the Maintenance of Internal Security Act (MISA) from 14 November 1975 to 18 December 1976. He participated in the satyagraha in Delhi against the deployment of the army to the Golden Temple in 1984. He was an active member of Rashtriya Swayamsevak Sangh and held many offices in the Andhra Pradesh Student Union, including Executive Member. He resided in Hanamakonda, Warangal.

Personal life and death 
Reddy married C. Sudeshma in 1953, with whom he had one son and two daughters. Reddy died in Hyderabad on 5 February 2022, at the age of 86.

References

External links
 Official biographical sketch in Parliament of India website

1935 births
2022 deaths
India MPs 1984–1989
Indian Hindus
Indians imprisoned during the Emergency (India)
Prisoners and detainees of British India
Bharatiya Jana Sangh politicians
Rashtriya Swayamsevak Sangh pracharaks
People from Telangana
Telangana politicians
Telugu politicians
Lok Sabha members from Andhra Pradesh
Osmania University alumni
Bharatiya Janata Party politicians from Telangana
Members of the Andhra Pradesh Legislative Assembly
Lok Sabha members from Telangana
People from Warangal